Amazon S3 Glacier is an online file storage web service that provides storage for data archiving and backup.

Glacier is part of the Amazon Web Services suite of cloud computing services, and is designed for long-term storage of data that is infrequently accessed and for which retrieval latency times of 3 to 5 hours are acceptable.  Storage costs are a consistent $0.004 per gigabyte per month, which is substantially cheaper than the Simple Storage Service (S3) Standard tier .

Amazon hopes this service will move businesses from on-premises tape backup drives to cloud-based backup storage.

Storage
The underlying technology used by Glacier is unknown and subject to speculation.

Amazon officially states in their S3 FAQS:

Q: What is the backend infrastructure supporting the S3 Glacier Flexible Retrieval and S3 Glacier Deep Archive storage class?

We prefer to focus on the customer outcomes of performance, durability, availability, and security. However, this question is often asked by our customers. We use a number of different technologies which allow us to offer the prices we do to our customers. Our services are built using common data storage technologies specifically assembled into purpose-built, cost-optimized systems using AWS-developed software. The S3 Glacier storage classes benefit from our ability to optimize the sequence of inputs and outputs to maximize efficiency accessing the underlying storage.

ZDNet says, that according to private e-mail, Glacier runs on "inexpensive commodity hardware components". In 2012, ZDNet quoted a former Amazon employee as saying that Glacier is based on custom low-RPM hard drives attached to custom logic boards where only a percentage of a rack's drives can be spun at full speed at any one time. Similar technology is also used by Facebook.

There is some belief among users that the underlying hardware used for Glacier storage is tape-based, owing to the fact that Amazon has positioned Glacier as a direct competitor to tape backup services (both on-premises and cloud-based).  This confusion is exacerbated by the fact that Glacier has archive retrieval delays (3–5 hours before archives are available) similar to that of tape-based systems and a pricing model that discourages frequent data retrieval.

The Register claimed that Glacier runs on Spectra T-Finity tape libraries with LTO-6 tapes. Others have conjectured Amazon using off-line shingled magnetic recording hard drives, multi-layer Blu-ray optical discs, or an alternative proprietary storage technology.

Data storage consultant Robin Harris speculated that the storage is based on cheap optical disks such as Blu-ray, based on hints from public sources.

Cost
Glacier has two costs, one for storage and one for retrieval. Uploading data to Glacier is free. Storage pricing is simple: it currently costs 0.4 cents per gigabyte per month, which is 82% cheaper than S3 Standard. When Glacier launched in 2012, the storage charge was set to 1 cent per gigabyte per month. This was reduced to 0.7 cents in September 2015 and to the current 0.4 cents in December 2016.

Glacier used to charge for retrievals based on peak monthly retrieval rate, meaning that (ignoring the free tier) if you downloaded four gigabytes in four hours, it would cost the same as if you downloaded 720 gigabytes in 720 hours, in a 30-day month. This made it cheaper to spread out data retrievals over a long period of time, but failing to do so could result in a surprisingly large bill. In one case, a user stored 15 GB of data in Glacier, retrieved 693 MB for testing, and ended up being charged for 126 GB due to retrieval rate calculation. This pricing policy was widely regarded as a "time bomb" set to go off on retrieval.

In 2016, AWS revised their retrieval pricing model. The new model bases the retrieval fee on the number of gigabytes retrieved. This can amount to a 99% price cut for users who perform only one Glacier retrieval in a month. At the same time, AWS introduced new methods of retrieval that take different amounts of time. An expedited retrieval costs one cent per request and three cents per gigabyte, and can retrieve data in one to five minutes. A standard retrieval costs five cents per thousand requests and one cent per gigabyte, and takes three to five hours. A bulk retrieval costs 2.5 cents per thousand requests and 0.25 cents per gigabyte, and takes seven to twelve hours. AWS also introduced provisioned capacity for expedited retrievals, each unit of which costs $100 per month and guarantees at least three expedited retrievals every five minutes, and up to 150 MB/s of retrieval bandwidth. Without provisioned capacity, expedited retrievals are done on a capacity available basis.

Data deleted from Glacier less than 90 days after being stored incurs a charge equal to the cost of storage for the remainder of the 90 days. (In effect, the user pays for 90 days minimum.) This move was designed to discourage the service's use in cases where Amazon's other storage offerings (e.g. S3) are more appropriate for real-time access. After 90 days, deletion from Glacier is free.

Retrieving data from Glacier is a two-step process. The first step is to retrieve the data into a staging area, where it stays for 24 hours. The second step is to download the data from the staging area, which may incur bandwidth charges.

Glacier is also available as a "storage class" in S3. Objects can only be put into Glacier by lifecycle rules, which can be configured to put the objects in Glacier once they have reached a certain age. Pricing is the same, but there is no staging area; instead, retrieved objects are simultaneously stored in Glacier and in Reduced Redundancy class for a number of days that the user specifies.

References

External links 

 

Cloud storage
Glacier